United Nations Security Council resolution 1621, adopted unanimously on 6 September 2005, after recalling all previous resolutions on the situation in the Democratic Republic of the Congo, including resolutions 1565 (2004) and 1592 (2005), the Council authorised the temporary increase in the strength of the United Nations Mission in the Democratic Republic of Congo (MONUC) to assist with upcoming elections.

The additional personnel joined the then-largest United Nations peacekeeping operation, totalling 19,000 personnel.

Resolution

Observations
The Council reiterated the importance of holding elections in the process of national reconciliation in the Democratic Republic of the Congo, and called upon all transitional institutions to ensure that they were free and fair. It welcomed efforts by the Congolese authorities to promote good governance and economic management, and praised the donor community for their contributions towards this process.

There was also concern at hostilities in the east of the country, including violations of human rights and international humanitarian law.

Acts
Acting under Chapter VII of the United Nations Charter, the Council approved of the Secretary-General Kofi Annan's recommendations to increase the size of MONUC by 841 personnel, including police units.  The resolution emphasised the temporary nature of the increase, with a view to its reduction from 1 July 2006. The additional units would provide support to the electoral commission, as well as assistance to the transitional government and international financial institutions to help promote good governance and economic management.

See also
 Kivu conflict
 Ituri conflict
 List of United Nations Security Council Resolutions 1601 to 1700 (2005–2006)
 Second Congo War

References

External links
 
Text of the Resolution at undocs.org

 1621
2005 in the Democratic Republic of the Congo
 1621
September 2005 events